Dipped in Black is an Australian short documentary film, directed by Matthew Thorne and Derik Lynch and released in 2022. The film centres on Lynch, a queer Yankunytjatjara theatre artist, as he returns to his hometown of Aputula to perform an inma in drag.

The film premiered at the 2022 Adelaide Film Festival. It was subsequently screened at the 73rd Berlin International Film Festival in February 2023, where it won the Teddy Award for best LGBTQ-themed short film. as well as the Silver Bear for Best Short Film

References

External links
 

2022 films
2022 short documentary films
2022 LGBT-related films
Australian short documentary films
Australian LGBT-related films
Documentary films about LGBT topics
Documentary films about Aboriginal Australians
LGBT-related short films
2020s English-language films
2020s multilingual films
Australian multilingual films
Drag (clothing)-related films